Emma Sansom High School (opened 1929 - closed 2006) was a high school located in Gadsden, Alabama.  It was named for a young girl (Emma Sansom) who was credited with helping General Nathan Bedford Forrest to cross Black Creek in Gadsden, Alabama and get his troops ahead of the Union troops thus stopping the impending attack upon Rome, Georgia during the Civil War.

Closure
Emma Sansom High School was closed in 2006 when the Gadsden City Board of Education consolidated the city high schools into All City High School now known as the Gadsden City High School. The Emma Sansom High School building was converted into a middle school beginning with the 2006/2007 academic year. General Forrest Middle School students were moved to the newly renamed Emma Sansom Middle School.

Emma Sansom Middle School offers many clubs and organizations, such as student government, quiz bowl, choral, band, art, and more. It also offers AP classes, such as pre-algebra. Students can participate in marching band as well as jazz band. Students compete on state level for choral and band and the band travels to places such as Disney World. Emma Sansom Middle School provides a range of sports opportunities including: basketball, football, softball, baseball, volleyball, track, tennis and more. 

In 2018 Ms. Jacqueline Tiller became principal and Mrs. Marcia Farabee was vice-principal. The school has 350 students and is currently a Title 1 school with 75% of students being on free and reduced lunches. Emma Sansom middle school received a B on their state report card for the 2017 school year. That was the highest middle school get in Etowah County. Emma Sansom faculty, staff and students are proud to be called the Emma Sansom Rebels!

Emma Sansom Middle School participates in service projects to help the community. During this time the students provided hygiene items to people in need during the holiday season in order to help teach the students that it is better to give than to receive.  The middle school's Rockettes' assisted in giving out these items to the people in need.

Band
Emma Sansom Middle School (ESMS) Band is directed by Stacy Harris. The advanced band has over 100 members, made up of 7th and 8th graders. The school has beginning, advanced and stage band classes. The marching band is the second biggest middle school band in Etowah County area. Often, much larger than area high school bands.

The Gadsden City High School Band has taken on the glory as well. With a band of 260, GCHS band is one of the most well known in the state.

References

External links 
 Emma Sansom High School Trophies
 Digital Yearbook Collection

Educational institutions established in 1929
Educational institutions disestablished in 2006
Defunct schools in Alabama
Buildings and structures in Gadsden, Alabama
Schools in Etowah County, Alabama
1929 establishments in Alabama
2006 disestablishments in Alabama